is the largest of the Yaeyama Islands of Japan, and the second largest in Okinawa Prefecture after Okinawa Island itself.

Administratively the island belongs to Taketomi Town, Okinawa Prefecture. Infrastructure is limited to a single coastal road connecting the hamlets on the northern and eastern shores.

Wildlife
The island is famed for the Iriomote cat, a Critically Endangered wild cat found only on Iriomote.  the population size is estimated to be 100–109 individuals.

The island has a venomous snake—Trimeresurus elegans, known locally as the habu, a species of pitviper whose bite has a fatality rate of 3% and a permanent disability rate of 6–8%.

Satakentia liukiuensis, the only species in the genus Satakentia, is a palm tree that is endemic to the two islands of Ishigaki and Iriomote in the Yaeyama Islands.

Culture
The Iriomote dialect of the Yaeyama language is spoken by some people on the island.

History
The island had few settlements of fishermen and rice growers on the coastal areas, but it never had a large population until the Iriomote Coal Mine operated between 1889 and 1959.

During World War II some residents of Ishigaki were forcibly made to take refuge in Iriomote, many of whom contracted malaria. After the war, the US Forces in Japan eradicated malaria from the island, and the island has been malaria-free since then. The island, together with the rest of Okinawa Prefecture, remained a US-controlled territory until 1972. Iriomote was returned to Japan on June 17, 1972.

The SONAR image of a large unexpected obstruction to the operations prompted the divers to command evasive maneuvers and avoid the area for the safety of the ROV.

The divers, thinking they would have another opportunity to work in the area at a later date, left the area and never returned to that site. Their ROV was lost in 1997 off Yonaguni Island, the last island belonging to Okinawa off the east coast of Taiwan. They were fairly certain that the object was a submarine, and quite possibly the USS Snook. No further dives in the area have yet been attempted.

One of the largest volcanic eruption took place at a submarine volcano north of the island in 1924. It had an estimated Volcanic explosivity index of 5. The island's coast was covered in large quantities of pumice and it was also found as far as Hokkaido.

Economy
Apart from tourism, the island economy is sustained by agricultural production, primarily of pineapple, sugarcane, mango, culture pearl growing  and fishing.

Geography and climate

90% of the island is covered by dense jungle and mangrove swamps. 80% of the island is protected state land, and 34.3% of the island forms the Iriomote National Park.
Yubu Island lies about 0.5 km east of Iriomote Island.

The island's Urauchi River is the largest river in Okinawa Prefecture, and the smaller Nakama and Nakara rivers also flow within the island. Iriomote is also home to Pinaisara Falls, the largest waterfall in Okinawa Prefecture.

Iriomote has a tropical rainforest climate (Köppen climate classification Af). Iriomote has a typhoon season that, on average, runs from June to September.

Education
Schools on Iriomote Island are operated by Taketomi Town.

Combined elementary and junior high schools include: 
 Funauki Elementary and Junior High School (竹富町立船浮小中学校)
 Iriomote Elementary and Junior High School(竹富町立西表小中学校)

Junior high schools include:
 Funaura Junior High School (竹富町立船浦中学校) - 
 Ōhara Junior High School (竹富町立大原中学校) - 

Elementary schools include:
 Komi Elementary School (竹富町立古見小学校) - 
 Ohara Elementary School (竹富町立大原小学校) - Haemi
 Shirama Elementary School (竹富町立白浜小学校) - Shirahama (白浜)
 Uehara Elementary School (竹富町立上原小学校) - Uehara

For public senior high school students may attend schools of the Okinawa Prefectural Board of Education.

Gallery

References

External links

Islands of Okinawa Prefecture
Yaeyama Islands